Gary Dan McPherson (July 5, 1936 – December 5, 2018) was an American college basketball coach. A native of Cass, West Virginia, McPherson led the VMI Keydets for five seasons before working as a West Virginia men's basketball coach for twenty years. He was also the head coach for the Alderson Broaddus Battlers in nearby Philippi for two seasons.

Early life
McPherson graduated from Green Bank High School (now known as Pocahontas County High School) in 1954 and attended college at Washington & Lee University. During his time at W&L, McPherson played on the football team, which at the time was competing in the Southern Conference, and earned a liberal arts degree.

Coaching career
Immediately following his graduation from Washington & Lee, McPherson began coaching for Bluestone High School in Skipwith, Virginia. He was the school's head football and basketball coach. Three years later McPherson left for Ferrum Junior College where he headed the Panther's basketball program for two seasons.

VMI
In 1963, McPherson joined the VMI Keydets basketball program and became the school's first full-time assistant coach. Under Louis "Weenie" Miller, McPherson and the Keydets ran through the 1964 Southern Conference Tournament en route to their first NCAA tournament appearance. Their season was promptly ended by Princeton in the first round.

Following the departure of Miller, McPherson would take over the helm and coach the Keydets for the next five years. The team failed to continue their success from the 1964 season, and McPherson did not achieve a winning season or advance in the SoCon tournament in his tenure there. He left the Institute with a 32–77 record.

West Virginia
Though his only time as a Division I head coach had finished, McPherson dedicated much of the next forty years to West Virginia University, largely as an assistant basketball coach. McPherson first worked under Sonny Moran in the 1970s, and later with Gale Catlett through the 1980s after a brief stint with Alderson Broaddus University. His coaching career came to an end in 1993, though McPherson continued to work with West Virginia as a fundraiser and director of the Mountaineer Athletic Club.

Personal life
McPherson was married to Peggy, and the couple had two children, Chris and Missy. in addition to his degree from Washington & Lee, McPherson also obtained a master's degree from the University of Virginia.

In a November 2012 basketball game between VMI and West Virginia in Morgantown, McPherson was honored for his contributions to both schools in an on-court presentation. He was joined by his wife along with WVU coach Bob Huggins, former VMI players John Kemper and Steve Powers, and then-VMI Director of Athletics Donny White.

McPherson died on December 5, 2018 in Morgantown, West Virginia.

Head coaching record

References

1936 births
2018 deaths
Alderson Broaddus Battlers men's basketball coaches
American men's basketball coaches
Basketball coaches from West Virginia
College men's basketball head coaches in the United States
High school basketball coaches in Virginia
High school football coaches in Virginia
Ferrum Panthers men's basketball coaches
People from Pocahontas County, West Virginia
Players of American football from West Virginia
University of Virginia alumni
VMI Keydets basketball coaches
Washington and Lee Generals football players
West Virginia Mountaineers men's basketball coaches